The 1983–84 Segunda División B season was the 7th since its establishment. The first matches of the season were played on 3 September 1983, and the season ended on 27 May 1984.

Overview before the season
40 teams joined the league, including four relegated from the 1982–83 Segunda División and 6 promoted from the 1982–83 Tercera División. The composition of the groups was determined by the Royal Spanish Football Federation, attending to geographical criteria.

Relegated from Segunda División
Deportivo Alavés
CE Sabadell FC
Xerez CD
Córdoba CF

Promoted from Tercera División

UD Figueras
RB Linense
Arosa SC
Manacor
Zamora CF
CD Ensidesa (merged with Real Avilés Industrial)

Group I

Teams
Teams from Andorra, Aragon, Asturias, Basque Country, Catalonia, Galicia and Navarre.

League table

Results

Top goalscorers

Top goalkeepers

Group II
Teams from Andalusia, Aragon, Balearic Islands, Castile and León, Castilla–La Mancha, Catalonia, Ceuta, Extremadura, Madrid, Region of Murcia and Valencian Community.

Teams

League table

Results

Top goalscorers

Top goalkeepers

Segunda División B seasons
3
Spain